Ceres is a municipality San Cristóbal Department, in Santa Fe Province, Argentina.

Ceres sits on National Route 34 and Provincial Route 17. It has a railway connection on FCA (ex-Mitre) with frequent general cargo, mining, cereals, and passenger trains, taking a good portion of the products from the Argentine Northwest to the port of Rosario.

Climate 

Ceres has a humid subtropical climate (Köppen climate classification Cwa) with mild, and dry winters and hot, humid summers. During the summer, temperatures can be hot during the day, averaging  in January but nighttime temperatures are more pleasant and cooler, averaging below . Spring and fall are transition seasons featuring warm weather during the day and cool weather at nighttime. The first and last dates of frost are June 18 and August 14 respectively. On average, Ceres averages 2,650 hours of sunshine a year (or 59% of possible sunshine hours), ranging from a low of 49% in June to a high of 65% in February.

References

External links

Provincial website

Jewish Argentine settlements
Populated places in Santa Fe Province
Populated places established in 1892